Robby Maruanaya (died 4 October 2020) was an Indonesian footballer and manager who played as a defender.

Playing career
During the 1970s and 1980s, Maruanaya played club football for Persipur Purwodadi. At international level, Maruanaya represented Indonesia during the 1980s, playing at the 1986 Asian Games in South Korea, whilst playing for Pelita Jaya.

Managerial career
Following his playing career, Maruanaya moved into management. Following a spell at PSBL Bandar Lampung, Maruanaya managed Persiwa Wamena, Persewar Waropen and Persimi Sarmi. In 2014, following a short spell at Perseru Serui, Maruanaya was appointed manager of Divisi Tiga club PS Freeport.

References

Date of birth missing
2020 deaths
Indonesian footballers
Indonesia international footballers
Association football defenders
Indonesian football managers
Association football coaches
Papuan sportspeople
Persipur Purwodadi players
Pelita Jaya FC players
Persiwa Wamena managers
Perseru Serui managers
Footballers at the 1986 Asian Games
Asian Games competitors for Indonesia
Sportspeople from Papua